Hans Unterkircher (22 August 1894 – 27 May 1971) was an Austrian stage and film actor and film director. He appeared in more than 60 films between 1916 and 1971. He was born in Graz, Austria and died in Vienna, Austria.

Selected filmography

 The Tiger Woman (1917)
 The Deciding Kiss (1918)
 The Brazen Beauty (1918)
 The Last Laugh (1924)
 The Wonderful Adventure (1924)
 The Four Marriages of Matthias Merenus (1924)
 The Adventurous Wedding (1925)
 Love Story (1925)
 The Right to Live (1927)
 The Uncle from Sumatra (1930)
 The Emperor's Candlesticks (1936)
 Darling of the Sailors (1937)
 Immortal Waltz (1939)
 Hotel Sacher (1939)
 A Mother's Love (1939)
 Beloved Augustin (1940)
 Love is Duty Free (1941)
 Two Happy People (1943)
 On Resonant Shores (1948)
 Sarajevo (1955)
 The Blue Danube (1955)
 Her Corporal (1956)
 Imperial and Royal Field Marshal (1956)
 Schweik's Awkward Years (1964)

See also
 List of Austrian film actors

References

External links

1894 births
1971 deaths
Austrian film actors
Austrian male film actors
Austrian male silent film actors
20th-century Austrian male actors
Film people from Graz
Actors from Graz